Nouveau Gloaming is the debut full-length album by Norwegian/English black metal band Code. The album was released on June 13, 2005 through Spikefarm Records.

Track listing
"The Cotton Optic" – 5:15
"Brass Dogs" – 7:49
"An Enigma In Brine" – 5:55
"A Cloud Formed Teardrop Asylum" – 7:25
"Aeon In Cinders" – 5:15
"Tyburn" – 6:10
"Radium" – 7:10
"Ghost Formula" – 8:56

Recording Line-Up
Aort (Blutvial) - Guitars
Yusaf "Viper" Parvez aka Vicotnik (Dødheimsgard, Ved Buens Ende) - Bass, backing vocals
Erik Olivier Lancelot aka AiwarikiaR (ex-Ulver, ex-Valhall) - Drums
Kvohst (ex-Void, Dødheimsgard) - Vocals
Vyttra - Guitar

References

2005 debut albums
Code (band) albums